Athiyaayam is a 2017 Singaporean Tamil-language workplace drama starring Jabu deen Faruk, Varman Chandra Mohan, J. Arabvind Naidu, N. Ashwini and Sundrajan Jeeva. It replaced Thalli Pogathey and it broadcast on MediaCorp Vasantham on Monday through Thursday from 25 September 2017 to 21 December 2017 at 10:30PM (SST) for 49 Episodes.

Synopsis
It is a story about in a corporate world where the Kalaivanans (Sundrajan Jeeva) strives to develop their family business. With 3 sons Vikiram (Jabu deen Faruk), Karthik (Varman Chandra Mohan) and Arjun (J. Arabvind Naidu) with very different characters, will they be able to succeed despite their differences and bond as brothers or will they separate due to seeds of discord sown by others?

Cast
Main
 Jabu Deen Faruk as Vikram
 Varman Chandra Mohan as Karthik
 J. Aravind Naidu as Arjun
 N. Ashwini as Nandhini
 Sundrajan Jeeva as Kalaivanan

Additional cast
 Shamini Gunasagar as Dharani
 Nisha Kumar as Pooja
 Malini
 Shafinah Banu as Seetha
 T. Suriavelan as Abbas
 Stephen Zechariah as Chris
 Malene as Yazhini
 R. Sammasundram
 Khomala Lea
 Balaji Srinivasan
 Michael Berhard
 Sudha Selvam
 Vemalan
 Narain
 Puravalan as Madhavan

Broadcast
Series was released on 25 September 2017 on Mediacorp Vasantham. It aired in Malaysia on Mediacorp Vasantham, Its full length episodes and released its episodes on their app Toggle, a live TV feature was introduced on Toggle with English Subtitle.

References

External links 
 Vasantham Official Website
 Vasantham Facebook
 Athiyaayam Serial Episodes

Vasantham TV original programming
Tamil-language television shows in Singapore
Tamil-language romance television series
Singapore Tamil dramas
2017 Tamil-language television series debuts
2017 Tamil-language television series endings